Granulina minusculina is a species of very small sea snail, a marine gastropod mollusk or micromollusk in the family Granulinidae.

Description
The length of the shell attains 1.9 mm.

Distribution
This species occurs in the Atlantic Ocean off Morocco.

References

 Smriglio C. & Mariottini P. (1999). Description of Granulina gubbiolii sp.nov. (Neogastropoda, Cystiscidae) from the Mediterranean Sea. La Conchiglia 292: 35–40

External links
 Locard, A. (1897–1898). Expéditions scientifiques du Travailleur et du Talisman pendant les années 1880, 1881, 1882 et 1883. Mollusques testacés. Paris, Masson. vol. 1 [1897], pp. 1–516 pl. 1–22; vol. 2 [1898], pp. 1–515, pl. 1–18
 Gofas, S.; Luque, Á. A.; Templado, J.; Salas, C. (2017). A national checklist of marine Mollusca in Spanish waters. Scientia Marina. 81(2) : 241–254, and supplementary online material.
  Gofas S. (1992) Le genre Granulina (Marginellidae) en Méditerranée et dans l'Atlantique oriental. Bollettino Malacologico 28(1–4): 1–26
 S.; Le Renard, J.; Bouchet, P. (2001). Mollusca. in: Costello, M.J. et al. (eds), European Register of Marine Species: a check-list of the marine species in Europe and a bibliography of guides to their identification. Patrimoines Naturels. 50: 180–213

Granulinidae
Gastropods described in 1897